Mutual Life Insurance Company may refer to:

 Asahi Mutual Life Insurance Co, based in Tokyo, Japan
 The Dai-ichi Mutual Life Insurance Company, based in Tokyo, Japan
 Golden State Mutual Life Insurance Company, based in Los Angeles, California
 Massachusetts Mutual Life Insurance Company
 Mutual Life Insurance Company of New York, later Mutual of New York (MONY), and now part of AXA
 New England Mutual Life Insurance Company, acquired by MetLife in 1995
 North Carolina Mutual Life Insurance Company
 Northwestern Mutual Life Insurance Company, based in Milwaukee, Wisconsin
 United Mutual Life Insurance Company, acquired by MetLife in 1992

See also 
 Mutual insurance, where policyholders have certain "ownership" rights in the organization